Igor Nascimento Soares (born August 3, 1979), or simply Igor, is a Brazilisn former football defender who played for Botafogo-SP in the Brazilian Série B.

Honours
 Campeonato Brasileiro in 2001 with Atlético Paranaense
 Campeonato Paranaense in 2001 and 2002 with Atlético Paranaense
 Paraná Superleague in 2002 with Atlético Paranaense
 Campeonato Carioca in 2005 with Fluminense
 Campeonato Pernambucano in 2007, 2008, 2009 and 2010 with Sport Club do Recife
 Copa do Brasil in 2008 with Sport Club do Recife
 Campeonato Paraibano in 2014 with Botafogo da Paraíba
 Campeonato Brasileiro Série D in 2015 with Botafogo-SP

Current contract
October 10, 2008 to December 31, 2011

External links
sambafoot.com
 CBF
 Sport Recife

1979 births
Living people
People from Ponta Grossa
Brazilian footballers
Association football defenders
Campeonato Brasileiro Série A players
Campeonato Brasileiro Série B players
Campeonato Brasileiro Série C players
Nacional Atlético Clube (SP) players
Club Athletico Paranaense players
Ponta Grossa Esporte Clube players
Fluminense FC players
Esporte Clube Juventude players
Botafogo de Futebol e Regatas players
Sport Club do Recife players
Mirassol Futebol Clube players
Guaratinguetá Futebol players
Botafogo Futebol Clube (SP) players
Botafogo Futebol Clube (PB) players
Sportspeople from Paraná (state)